Tezerj (also Romanized as Tazarj; also known as Tererj) is a village in Tarom Rural District, in the Central District of Hajjiabad County, Hormozgan Province, Iran. At the 2006 census, its population was 320, in 95 families.

References 

Populated places in Hajjiabad County